Kwami is a Local Government Area of Gombe State, Nigeria. It has its headquarters in the town of Mallam Sidi. Kwami is bordered in the east by Lake Dadin Kowa, in the north by funakaye and Gombe in the south. The postal code of the area is 760.

Population 
The population of  Kwami in 2006 census is 195,298.

Geographical location 
Kwami LGA has a total area of 1,787 square kilometres and lies on the banks of Lake Dadinkowa. The area witnesses two major seasons which are the dry and the rainy seasons. The average temperature in Kwami LGA is 32 °C.

Economy of Kwami 
The dwellers of Kwami engaged in many different economical activities but the most common one is farming and fishing.

Infrastructure 
In December 2022, Gombe State Governor Muhammad Inuwa Yahaya reiterated the state government's plan to begin construction of the road connecting Kwami and Malam-Sidi, the LGA's headquarters, to reduce administrative challenges and bring economic and social prosperity to the people of the LGA.

Altitude 
481 m (1,578 ft)

References

Local Government Areas in Gombe State